Target archery is the most popular form of archery, in which members shoot at stationary circular targets at varying distances. All types of bow – longbow, barebow, recurve and compound – can be used. In Great Britain, imperial rounds, measured in yards, are still used for many tournaments and these have slightly different rules to metric (WA) rounds, which are used internationally. Archers are divided into seniors and juniors, with juniors being those under the age of 21.

Modern competitive target archery is governed by the World Archery Federation (abbreviated WA), formerly FITA – Fédération Internationale de Tir à l'Arc. WA is the International Olympic Committee's (IOC) recognized governing body for all of archery and Olympic rules are derived from the WA rules.

Currently 142 nations are represented by WA archery governing bodies. The largest of these are the FFTA (French archery federation) with approximately 60,000 members, FITARCO (Italian federation), DSB (German federation), AJAF (All-Japan Archery Federation), and the GNAS (Grand National Archery Society) of Great Britain, with approximately 30,000 members which has now re-branded itself as Archery GB. In the United States the WA affiliated governing body is USA Archery (National Archery Association of the United States), which dates to the 1870s, making it the third oldest archery governing body after GNAS and FITARCO, which date to the 1860s.

Rules

Archery competitions may be held indoors or outdoors. Indoor rounds are normally shot at one distance, whereas outdoor competitions normally consist of several distances. For lists of tournament rounds, see section entitled Tournament Rounds.
Since archery involves the use of potentially lethal equipment, much attention is paid to order and safety. Whistle commands are used to signal the different phases of shooting, or an 'end'. Two whistle blasts means archers can approach the shooting line.  One whistle blast means archers can begin shooting. The archers are not allowed to collect their arrows whilst other archers are shooting. The signal to collect your arrows is three whistles from the field captain. These rules apply to all forms of target archery. Other rules, or points of etiquette, include:
 The command Fast means stop shooting immediately and return the unshot arrow to the quiver. It is used when the situation becomes suddenly and unexpectedly dangerous.
 Do not distract another archer when they are shooting. If an archer is at full draw, wait before taking your place on the shooting line.
 If an archer damages another archer's arrows (or other equipment), they must offer to pay for any damages.

Metric Rounds (WA rules)
The juniors have shorter targets to shoot at. In Olympic archery,  is the standard range. Indoor distances are either . 

Competition is divided into ends. An archer shoots either 3 or 6 arrows per end, depending on the type of round. After each end, the competitors walk to the target to score and retrieve their arrows. An indoor competition is usually 20 ends of 3 arrows.

Archers have a set time limit in which to shoot their arrows. For indoor competition, under World Archery Federation rules this is 2 minutes for 3 arrows. Signalling devices such as lights and flags inform the archers when time is up. For a 1440 outdoor round the archer has 4 minutes to shoot 6 arrows at the two longer distances, and 2 minutes to shoot 3 arrows at the remaining two shorter distances.

Imperial Rounds (GNAS rules)

Competition is divided into ends. An archer shoots either 3 arrows per end (indoors) or 6 arrows per end (outdoors). After each end, the competitors walk to the target to score and retrieve their arrows. An indoor Worcester round shoots in ends of 5 arrows.

At all record status tournaments, archers must adhere to the AGB dress code. The recognized dress is plain dark green and/or white, or 'club colours'. Club colours are unique to a club, and registered on the AGB shooting colour register. However, any colour garments may be worn with the exception of blue denim, olive drab and camouflage pattern.

In a tournament, awards are normally split into categories according to bowstyle, gender and, for juniors, age. All registered AGB archers also have an indoor and an outdoor classification, and classification awards may also be presented - this allows archers to only shoot against those of the same ability.

Classifications

The Grand National Archery Society runs two systems of classification: the main Classifications (for indoor and outdoor shooting) and Handicaps. To do this, they produce tables of scores for all recognised rounds and an archer's classification and handicap can be worked out from their scores, normally by a club's Record Officer.

For indoor rounds, an archer has a classification represented by a letter from A to H, with A being the best and H the worst. This applies for both seniors and juniors.

Scoring

Standard WA targets are marked with 10 evenly spaced concentric rings, which generally have score values from 1 through 10 assigned to them, except in outdoor Imperial rounds under AGB rules, where they have score values 1, 3, 5, 7 and 9. In addition, there is an inner 10 ring, sometimes called the X ring. This becomes the 10 ring at indoor compound competitions. Outdoors, it serves as a tiebreaker with the archer scoring the most X's winning. The number of hits may also be taken into account as another tiebreaker. In World Archery, targets are coloured as follows:
 1 ring & 2 ring – white 
 3 ring & 4 ring – black 
 5 ring & 6 ring – blue 
 7 ring & 8 ring – red 
 9 ring, 10 ring & inner 10 ring – gold
The inner ring is usually used for tie-breaking (the competitor closest to the X is the winner)

Archers score each end by summing the scores for their arrows. An arrow just touching a scoring boundary line, known as a Line Breaker or Line Cutter,  is awarded the higher score. Values scored by each arrow are recorded on a score sheet and must be written in descending order (e.g. if an archer scores 5, 7, 6, 10, 9, 8, this must be recorded as 10, 9, 8, 7, 6, 5). During and before scoring no one is allowed to touch the arrows. This is so that if there is disputed arrow score then a judge may be called and the judge makes a ruling on how the arrow lies. The archer in charge of scoring on a target at a tournament is known as the ''Target Captain'' and in larger tournaments, they may be assisted by a ''Target Lieutenant''; a Target Captain makes an initial judgment on all disputed arrows. Under WA rules, in major tournaments, after scoring, each hole is marked before arrows are retrieved. In the event of a "pass through" (the arrow passes straight through the target) or "bouncer" (arrow hits the target and bounces out), points may be awarded to an unmarked hole. Under AGB rules, and in some smaller tournaments, in the case of a bouncer, the archer must step off the shooting line and hold their bow in the air. A judge then decides whether the archer is permitted to shoot a replacement arrow. If an archer accidentally shoots more arrows than allowed, the highest scoring arrow is not counted and a miss is recorded.

rounds

Different rounds and distances use different size target faces. Common sizes (and example rounds they are used in) are:
  ( WA Indoor Compound) 
  ( WA Indoor Recurve) 
  ( WA) 
  ( WA)

 faces are used in Olympic competition. A variant of the  face, called a "Spot" may be used when shooting WA rounds. This variant shows only the inner 6 rings of a full  face. There are also versions of the  targets known as the "3 Spot". The targets contain 3 instances of the inner 5 rings of the  faces arranged in a line or an equilateral triangle. This is to stop competitors from damaging their own arrows by shooting a "robin hood".

Tournament rounds
Imperial rounds (measured in yards) are mainly shot in the United Kingdom. Metric rounds, also known as WA rounds, measured in metres, are used for most other tournaments. These are the main rounds that are able to be shot in target archery:

How to use the tables
Go down the first column of the relevant table until you get to the round you require. Go across this row to find out how many arrows you shoot at each distance (yds=yards, m=metres, doz.=dozen). An – means no arrows are shot at this distance.

Imperial rounds
These rounds use 5-zone scoring, as opposed to the usual 10-zone scoring. The points are awarded as follows: 9 for a gold, 7 for a red, 5 for a blue, 3 for a black and 1 for a white. Senior rounds are for archers aged 18 and over and junior rounds are for archers under the age of 18.

Metric rounds
These rounds use standard 10-zone scoring. The furthest two distances are shot on a  face target; the nearer two on an  face target.

[Source for tournament rounds: Dave Pritchard and Phil Hale, Bowmen Of The Tors: Handbook For New Archers DRP Publications, 2001]

Olympics
Archery was in the Olympics (and the 1906 Intercalated Games) between 1900, the second modern Olympics, and 1920. The sport was dropped from the program because there were no internationally recognized rules for the sport- each Olympics through 1920 held a different type of event. With the creation of FITA in the 1930s, set international rules were created. However, it was not until 1972 that Archery was re-introduced with the individual event, and in 1988 the team event was added to the program. Further competition rules changes were made for the 1992 Olympic Games, which introduced match play to the program in the form of the Archery Olympic Round.

The only type of bow allowed to be used at Olympic level is the recurve bow. Since the 1984 Games at Los Angeles, South Korea has dominated the women's event. At the Sydney 2000 games, the Korean women won bronze, silver and gold in the individual competition and won gold in the team event. They also won the gold team medal in the 2004 Athens games, the 2008 Beijing games, and the 2012 London games.

See also
World Archery Championships
Field Archery
Clout Archery
History of Archery
Arrow
Bow
Archery
Shooting sports
Crossbow
Modern competitive archery

References

External links
 Archery GB Rules of Shooting

Archery

ru:Стрельба из лука